Events in the year 1601 in Norway.

Incumbents
Monarch: Christian IV

Events
Jørgen Friis was appointed Governor-General of Norway.

Births
Isak Lauritssøn Falck, merchant (died 1669).

See also

References